The Myrtle Avenue station (announced on New Technology Trains as Myrtle Avenue–Broadway station) is a New York City Subway express station on the BMT Jamaica Line. Located at the intersection of Myrtle Avenue and Broadway in Bedford–Stuyvesant, Brooklyn, it is served by the J and M trains at all times, and by the Z  during rush hours in peak direction.

The station has two platform levels, but all regular passenger service is on the lower platform level of the station. The station has an abandoned upper platform level which previously served the BMT Myrtle Avenue Line to Downtown Brooklyn and Lower Manhattan via the Brooklyn Bridge. Just east of the station, the remaining section of the BMT Myrtle Avenue Line diverges from the BMT Jamaica Line via slip switches in an at-grade junction.

History 
The lower level of the station opened on June 25, 1888.

The upper level station, which was marked on signs as Broadway, opened on April 27, 1889, when the Myrtle Avenue Line was extended east along Myrtle Avenue to Broadway. A transfer opportunity was created to the BMT Jamaica Line station. The previous station located nearby at Stuyvesant Avenue was then closed. The Myrtle Avenue Line was extended from this station to Wyckoff Avenue on July 21, 1889.

The BMT Myrtle Avenue Line from Broadway to Bridge–Jay Streets closed on October 4, 1969, and was replaced via transfer to the B54 bus toward Jay Street.

Station layout

Lower level

This elevated station, opened on September 16, 1888, on the lower level, has three tracks and two island platforms. The center track is used by J and Z trains when they run express between this station and Marcy Avenue in the peak direction on weekdays during rush hours and middays, as well as by late night M shuttle trains from Metropolitan Avenue. East of this station, J and Z trains continue along Broadway, while M trains branch off through an S curve towards the BMT Myrtle Avenue Line. The connection to the Myrtle Avenue Line is one of the few remaining level junctions in the subway as well as one of the few places on revenue tracks with slip switches. From June 2017 until April 2018, this connection was closed due to long-term construction on the Myrtle Avenue Line.

This station is announced as Myrtle Avenue–Broadway station on New Technology Train cars to distinguish it from the nearby Myrtle–Wyckoff Avenues station.

Both platforms have brown canopies with green support columns and frames for their entire length except for a small section at either end. The station signs are in the standard black plates in white lettering.

The 1999 artwork here is called Jammin' Under the El by Verna Hart. It consists of stained glass windows on the platforms' sign structures as well as the station house depicting various scenes related to music.

As part of the Metropolitan Transportation Authority's 2015–2019 Capital Program, a station entrance will be rebuilt at the northwestern corner of Jefferson Street and Broadway, and a second mezzanine will be reopened.  In 2019, the MTA announced that this station would become ADA-accessible as part of the agency's 2020–2024 Capital Program.

Upper level

The upper level station (which was marked on signs as Broadway) opened on April 27, 1889, and created a transfer opportunity to the BMT Jamaica Line. The previous station located nearby at Stuyvesant Avenue was then closed. The upper level station contained two tracks and an island platform, with stairs to both of the existing platforms on the lower level. The Myrtle Avenue upper level was extended to Wyckoff Avenue on July 21, 1889. The BMT Myrtle Avenue Line from Broadway to Bridge–Jay Streets closed on October 4, 1969, and was replaced via transfer to the B54 bus toward Jay Street.

Exits

The lower level station has an elevated station house to the west underneath the skeletal remains of the BMT Myrtle Avenue Line. Two staircases from each platform go down to an elevated cross-under, where a shorter staircase on the Queens-bound side leads to the station house's waiting area. Outside the turnstile bank, there is a token booth and two staircases going down to either of the western corners at Myrtle Avenue and Broadway.

In popular culture
In the 1990 drama Ghost, Patrick Swayze follows his killer, Rick Aviles, leaving the J train onto the station's platform and entrance. In 1994, it was shown in the music video for Here Comes the Hotstepper by Jamaican dancehall artist Ini Kamoze.

Notes

References

External links 

 Station Reporter — J Train
 Station Reporter — M Train
 MTA's Arts For Transit — Myrtle Avenue (BMT Jamaica Line)
 Myrtle Avenue entrance from Google Maps Street View
 Platform and unused upper level from Google Maps Street View

BMT Jamaica Line stations
1888 establishments in New York (state)
New York City Subway stations in Brooklyn
Railway stations in the United States opened in 1888
Bushwick, Brooklyn
Bedford–Stuyvesant, Brooklyn